Rav Yemar (or Rav Yeimar  or Rav Jemar) was an Babylonian rabbi, of the sixth and seventh generations of amoraim.

According to Sherira Gaon, he filled the place of Rav Ashi as head of the Sura Academy for five years (427-432).

References

Talmud rabbis of Babylonia
Rabbis of Academy of Sura